Ursel Barkey (born 8 November 1941) is a German figure skater. She competed in the women's singles event at the 1960 Winter Olympics.

References

1941 births
Living people
German female single skaters
Olympic figure skaters of the United Team of Germany
Figure skaters at the 1960 Winter Olympics
Sportspeople from Cologne